Juan David Agudelo (born 11 January 1982 in Bogotá, Colombia) is a Colombian actor, TV host and model.

Career
Juan David started his acting career in 2008 in the Colombian TV Series  “Padres e Hijos” produced by Colombiana de T.V.

In 2009 he gained international recognition for his work in the Soap Opera   “Niños Ricos, pobres padres” co-produced by  Telemundo and RTI.

In 2010 he worked in “El Clon” for Telemundo and participates in “La reina del Sur”.

Filmography

Television
 Primera dama (2011) - Diego Santander 
 Terapia de pareja (2011) - Pablo (young)
 Tu voz estéreo (2011) (Episode "Gigolo a domicilio")
 Mujeres al límite (2010) - Novicio Santiago
 Decisiones (2010) (Episode "Yo la mato")
 El Clon (2010) - Fernando Escobar 
 Karabudjan (2010) (Antena 3)
 Victorinos (2010) - Jonathan
 Niños Ricos, Pobres Padres (2009) - Juan Alarcón 
 Café con aroma de mujer (2021) - Bernardo Vallejo

Movies
 Papa Rebelde - (2016) - Jorge Mario Bergoglio
 Límites - (2008) - Felipe

References

External links
 
 Official Facebook of Juan David Agudelo
 Official Twitter of Juan David Agudelo

Male actors from Bogotá
Colombian male telenovela actors
Colombian male television actors
1982 births
Living people
20th-century Colombian people